Darwin Todd Hobbs (born November 30, 1968) is an American gospel music singer noted for his vocal similarity to classic soul singers Luther Vandross, Freddie Jackson and Lou Rawls. In addition to his career as a gospel artist, Hobbs and his ensemble The Darwin Hobbs Choir have also performed both studio and live background vocals for artists such as Switchfoot, Jars of Clay, BeBe Winans, Marvin Winans, CeCe Winans, Michael W. Smith, T.D. Jakes, Shirley Murdock, Michael McDonald, including a duet with the one and only "disco queen" Donna Summer and countless others. Hobbs also played a small acting role in the HBO movie Boycott. His single, "Everyday", appeared on the Soul Power compilation album.

In April 2008, Hobbs launched the Break the Silence blog, which is geared toward providing emerging leaders with the honest tools and perspectives necessary to become successful in life and in ministry.

Discography

Albums
 Mercy (EMI Gospel, 1999)
 Vertical (EMI Gospel, 2000) (Billboard Gospel No. 26)
 Broken (EMI Gospel, 2003) (Billboard Gospel No. 3)
 Worshipper (EMI Gospel, 2005) (Billboard Gospel No. 8)
 Free (Tyscot Records, 2008)
 Champion (Imago Dei Music Group, 2010) (Billboard Gospel No. 6)

Singles
 "Everyday"
 "Nobody Like Jesus"
 "Beautiful to Me"
 "Free"
 "Champion"

References

External links
Darwin Hobbs' Website Official Site
Broken Review Gospelflava.com
Darwin's first Live recording:"Champion" Gospelcity.com
 Darwin Hobbs Stops Charging Set Fee For Ministry Dates Gospelpundit.com

American gospel singers
1968 births
Living people